Kasavuthattam is a 1967 Indian Malayalam film, directed and produced by Kunchacko. The film stars Prem Nazir, Sharada, Adoor Bhasi and Manavalan Joseph in the lead roles. The film had musical score by G. Devarajan.

Cast

Prem Nazir as Abu
Sharada as Jameela
Adoor Bhasi as Khader
Manavalan Joseph as Thomas
Jijo
Bahadoor as Pokkar
Kottarakkara Sreedharan Nair as Abdukarim Musaliar Muthalali
Nagu
Pankajavalli as Musaliar Muthalali's Mother
Rajeshwari as Amina
S. P. Pillai as Paarakkoottathil Aliyaar

Soundtrack
The music was composed by G. Devarajan and the lyrics were written by Vayalar Ramavarma.

References

External links
 

1967 films
1960s Malayalam-language films